The term afford (or AFFORD) may refer to:

Affordance, a potential action enabled by an object
Afford (surname), an English surname
Australian Foundation for Disability, an Australian non-profit organization